The 1900 United States presidential election in South Carolina took place on November 6, 1900. Voters chose 9 representatives, or electors, to the Electoral College, who voted for the President and Vice President.

South Carolina overwhelmingly voted for the Democratic nominee, former U.S. Representative and 1896 Democratic presidential nominee William Jennings Bryan, over the Republican nominee, President William McKinley. Bryan won South Carolina by a landslide margin of 85.92% in this rematch of the 1896 presidential election. Despite McKinley’s decisive victory nationwide as a result of the return of economic prosperity and recent victory in the Spanish–American War, South Carolina proved to be his weakest state, due to the nearly complete disfranchisement of the black majority that was the party’s sole support in the state.

This would be the last election when the Republican Party won any county in South Carolina until Dwight D. Eisenhower in 1952, and the last when any county voted against the Democrats until Dixiecrat Strom Thurmond carried every county except Anderson and Spartanburg in 1948.

Results

Results by county

References

South Carolina
1900
1900 South Carolina elections